Dominica ( or ;;  ;), officially the Commonwealth of Dominica, is an island country in the Caribbean. The capital, Roseau, is located on the western side of the island. It is geographically situated as part of the Windward Islands chain in the Lesser Antilles archipelago in the Caribbean Sea. Dominica's closest neighbours are two constituent territories of the European Union, the overseas departments of France, Guadeloupe to the northwest and Martinique to the south-southeast. The population was 71,293 at the 2011 census.

The island was settled by the Arawak arriving from South America in the fifth century. The Kalinago displaced the Arawak by the 15th century. Columbus is said to have passed the island on Sunday, 3 November 1493. It was later colonised by Europeans, predominantly by the French from the 1690s to 1763. The French imported enslaved people from West Africa to Dominica to work on coffee plantations. Great Britain took possession in 1763 after the Seven Years' War, and it gradually established English as its official language. The island gained independence as a republic in 1978.

Dominica has been nicknamed the "Nature Island of the Caribbean" for its natural environment. It is the youngest island in the Lesser Antilles, and in fact it is still being formed by geothermal-volcanic activity, as evidenced by the world's second-largest hot spring, called Boiling Lake. The island has lush mountainous rainforests and is the home of many rare plants, animals, and bird species. There are xeric areas in some of the western coastal regions, but heavy rainfall occurs inland. The Sisserou parrot, also known as the Imperial amazon, is critically endangered and found only on Dominica. It is the island's national bird and is featured on the national flag, making Dominica one of only two sovereign nations whose official flag features the color purple. The country is a member of the Commonwealth of Nations, the United Nations, the Organization of American States, the Organisation internationale de la Francophonie, the Organisation of Eastern Caribbean States and the Non-Aligned Movement.

Etymology
Dominica's name is pronounced with emphasis on the third syllable, following the Spanish pronunciation of its name given to it by Christopher Columbus.

History

Geologic history 
Dominica first emerged from the sea during the Oligocene era approximately 26 million years ago, making it one of the last Caribbean islands to be formed by volcanic activity.

Pre-colonial period and early European contact 
Dominica's precolonial indigenous inhabitants were the Island Carib people, who are thought to have driven out the previous Arawak population. The Caribs called the island Wai‘tu kubuli, which means "Tall is her body."

Christopher Columbus, sailing for Spain, named the island as Dominica, after the Latin term dies Dominica for Sunday, the day on which the Spanish first saw it in November 1493. Some Spanish colonisers settled here. But, as European explorers and settlers entered the region, indigenous refugees from surrounding islands settled Dominica and pushed out the Spanish settlers. The Spanish instead settled other areas that were easier to control.

French colony 

Spain had little success in colonising Dominica. In 1632, the French Compagnie des Îles de l'Amérique claimed it and other "Petites Antilles" for France, but no physical occupation took place. Between 1642 and 1650, French missionary Raymond Breton became the first regular European visitor to the island.

In 1660, the French and English agreed that Dominica and St. Vincent should not be settled, but instead left to the Carib as neutral territory—but its natural resources attracted expeditions of English and French foresters, who began harvesting timber. In 1690, the French established their first permanent settlements. French woodcutters from Martinique and Guadeloupe began to set up timber camps to supply the French islands with wood, and they gradually became permanent settlers. They brought the first enslaved Africans from West Africa to Dominique, as they called it in French.

In 1715, a revolt of "poor white" smallholders in the north of Martinique, known as La Gaoulé, caused settlers to migrate to southern Dominique, where they set up smallholdings. Meanwhile, French families and others from Guadeloupe settled in the north. In 1727, the first French commander, M. Le Grand, took charge of the island with a basic French government. Dominique formally became a colony of France, and the island was divided into districts or "quarters". The French had already developed plantation agriculture on Martinique and Guadeloupe, where they cultivated sugarcane with enslaved African workers. In Dominique they gradually developed coffee plantations. Because of the trans-Atlantic slave trade, the general population came to consist primarily of black-African slaves.

In 1761, during the Seven Years' War in Europe, a British expedition against Dominica led by Andrew Rollo conquered the island, along with several other Caribbean islands. In 1763, France had lost the war and ceded the island to Great Britain under the Treaty of Paris. The same year, the British established a legislative assembly, with only European colonists represented. French remained the official language, but Antillean Creole, which had developed from it, was spoken by most of the population.

In 1778 the French, with the active co-operation of the population, began the re-capture of Dominica. This was ended by the Treaty of Paris (1783), which returned the island to British control. But the island population, especially the class of free people of color, resisted British restrictions. The British retained control throughout French invasions in 1795 and 1805, the first taking place during the period of the Haitian Revolution, which gained the independence of Haiti (formerly Saint-Domingue, France's richest Caribbean colony).

British colony 

Great Britain established a small colony in 1805. It used Dominica as part of the Trans-Atlantic Slave Trade, by which slaves were imported and sold as labour in the islands as part of a trade that included producing and shipping sugar and coffee as commodity crops to Europe. The best documented slave plantation on the island is Hillsborough Estate, which had 71 male and 68 female slaves.  The Greg family were notable: Thomas Hodgson, a brother-in-law, owned a slave ship, and Thomas Greg and his son John Greg were part-owners of sugar plantations on Dominica.  In January 1814, 20 slaves absconded from Hillsborough. They were recorded as recaptured and punished with 100 lashes applied to the males and 50 for the females. The slaves reportedly said that one of their people had died in the plantation hospital, and they believed he had been poisoned.

In 1831, reflecting a liberalisation of official British racial attitudes, the Brown Privilege Bill conferred political and social rights on free blacks (mostly free people of colour, who generally were of mixed race, with African and European ancestry). With the Slavery Abolition Act of 1833, Britain ended the institution of slavery throughout its empire, except in India.

With freedom came enfranchisement. In 1835, the first three men of African descent were elected to the legislative assembly of Dominica. Many slaves from the neighbouring French colonial islands of Guadeloupe and Martinique fled to Dominica. In 1838, Dominica became the first colony of the British West Indies to have an elected legislature controlled by an ethnic African majority. Most of these legislators had been free people of colour and smallholders or merchants before the abolition of slavery. Their economic and social views were different from the interests of the small, wealthy English planter class. Reacting to a perceived threat to their power, the planters lobbied for more direct British rule.

In 1865, after much agitation and tension, the colonial office replaced the elective assembly with one made up of one-half members who were elected and one-half who were appointed. Planters, who were allied with colonial administrators, outmanoeuvred the elected legislators on many occasions. In 1871, Dominica became part of the British Leeward Islands. The political power of the elected assembly progressively eroded. Crown colony government was re-established in 1896.

Early 20th century 

In World War I, many Dominicans, mainly the sons of small farmers, volunteered to fight in Europe for the British Empire. After the war, an upsurge of political consciousness throughout the Caribbean led to the formation of the Representative Government Association. Marshaling public frustration with the lack of a voice in governing Dominica, this group won one-third of the popularly elected seats of the legislative assembly in 1924, and one-half in 1936. In 1940, administration of Dominica was transferred from the British Leeward Islands to the British Windward Islands. During World War II, some Dominicans volunteered in British and Caribbean forces. Thousands of Free French refugees from Martinique and Guadeloupe escaped to Dominica from the Vichy-controlled French islands, staying in Roseau and other villages.

Until 1958, Dominica was governed as part of the British Windward Islands. Caribbean islands sought independence from 1958 to 1962, and Dominica became a province of the short-lived West Indies Federation in 1958. After the federation dissolved in 1962, Dominica became an associated state of the United Kingdom in 1967, and formally took responsibility for its internal affairs. On 3 November 1978, the Commonwealth of Dominica was granted independence as a republic, led by Prime Minister Patrick John.

Post-independence
In mid-1979, political discontent with Founding Prime Minister Patrick John's administration climaxed in a civilian coup and ended in the passage of a Motion of No Confidence in the House of Assembly, Dominica's legislature, against John, collapsing the John administration. A new, so-called "Interim Government" was formed under Dominica's second Prime Minister Oliver Seraphin; Seraphin's main task was to prepare the country for fresh general elections constitutionally due in 1980, hence the unofficial title "Interim" Prime Minister. Seraphin organized and led a splinter of the Dominica Labour Party called the Democratic Labour Party into the 1980 general election and lost mainly because his nearly 13 month-long premiership was dominated by the fallout from Category Five Hurricane David, which caused 56 deaths and untold damage across the island. Hurricane Allen the following year caused further damage. After the 1980 election, Seraphin's government was replaced by one led by the Dominica Freedom Party (DFP) under Prime Minister Eugenia Charles; she was the Caribbean's first female Prime Minister.

In 1981, Charles's government was threatened with two attempted coups. The first was led by Frederick Newton, commander of the Military of Dominica, who organised an attack on the police headquarters in Roseau which resulted in the death of a police officer. Newton and five other soldiers were found guilty in the attack and sentenced to death in 1983; the sentences of the five accomplices were later commuted to life in prison, but Newton was executed in 1986. A second occurred later in the year when the country was threatened with a takeover by mercenaries in Operation Red Dog, led by Mike Perdue and Wolfgang Droege. They tried to overthrow Charles as Prime Minister and reinstall ex-Prime Minister John in exchange for control over the country's development. The FBI was tipped off, and the ship hired to transport the mercenaries never left dock. The mercenaries lacked formal military experience or training, and most of the crew had been misled into joining by the ringleader Mike Perdue. White supremacist Don Black was also jailed for his part in the attempted coup, which violated US neutrality laws.

The Charles government supported the 1983 American invasion of Grenada, earning Dominica praise from the U.S. government of Ronald Reagan, and an increase in financial aid.

By the middle of the 1980s, the economy had begun to recover, before weakening again due to a decrease in banana prices. Eugenia Charles won the 1985 general election, becoming only the first incumbent Dominica Prime Minister to be popularly re-elected. The continuing downturn in the economy and the tight grip by Eugenia Charles on Dominica politics gave rise to a self-titled "Third Force" political formation in 1988, which disrupted the traditional two-party arrangement of governing DFP and opposition DLP. "Third Force" soon formalized as United Workers Party and selected as its leader Edison James, the former General Manager of the Dominica Banana Marketing Company. This was a strategic selection given James's prestige among banana farmers and his originating from the East or Atlantic Coast that had begun to feel alienated by the West or Caribbean Sea Coast elites in Roseau, Dominica's capital. Eugenia Charles again won the 1990 general election, the first incumbent Dominica Prime Minister to win three consecutive general elections. However, Eugenia Charles's DFP had been pushed to within one seat of losing its majority in Parliament by the emergence of the UWP. It was, therefore, no great surprise when Eugenia Charles gave up political leadership of the Dominica Freedom Party in 1993 and did not contest the 1995 general election in any capacity. No longer benefiting from the veteran charismatic leadership of Prime Minister Eugenia Charles, the Dominica Freedom Party lost the 1995 election to the United Workers' Party (UWP), whose leader Edison James became Prime Minister. James, former General Manager of the Dominica Banana Marketing Company attempted to diversify the Dominican economy away from over-reliance on bananas. The crop was largely destroyed by Hurricane Luis in 1995. Further James was unable to restore banana to its former selling price and prestige. Moreover, the James administration became embroiled in Opposition charges of official corruption.

In the 31 January 2000 general election, the UWP were defeated by a coalition of the DLP, led by left-leaning Roosevelt B. "Rosie" Douglas and the Dominica Freedom Party led by former trade union leader, Charles Savarin. Douglas became Prime Minister. One UWP member of the House of Assembly crossed the floor, joining the DLP-DFP coalition government. However, Douglas died on 1 October 2000 after only a few months. Prime Minister Douglas was replaced by Pierre Charles, who also died in office on 6 January 2004. Roosevelt Skerrit, also of the DLP, replaced Pierre Charles as Prime Minister, becoming the world's youngest head of government at the age of 31. Under Skerrit's leadership, the DLP won elections in May 2005 that gave the party 12 seats in the 21-seat Parliament, to the UWP's 8 seats. An independent candidate affiliated with the DLP won a seat as well. Later, the independent candidate joined the government. With his 2005 election win, Skerrit became only the second incumbent Prime Minister of seven to be popularly re-elected.

In the 2009 election, the DLP won 18 of 21 seats. The UWP claimed campaign improprieties and embarked on a wide range of protest actions, including boycott of Parliament. UWP's boycott lasted at least three unauthorized absences from Parliament for two of their three Elected Representatives in Parliament in violation of Parliamentary procedure, leading to their two seats being declared vacant and by-elections being called to fill them; by-elections were conducted for those two vacant seats in July 2010, and the UWP again won both seats. The DLP under Skerrit went on to win the 2014 Dominican general election.

On 17 September 2012 Eliud Thaddeus Williams was sworn in as President (a largely ceremonial role), replacing Dr. Nicholas Liverpool who was reportedly removed from office due to ill health. On 30 September 2013 former Trade Union leader and former Dominica Freedom Party leader Charles Savarin was elected president having only days before resigned as a Minister of Government. He is  Dominica’s eighth President.

Tropical Storm Erika devastated the island in August 2015, killing 30 and causing severe environmental and economic damage. Dominica was again struck on 18 September 2017, suffering a direct landfall from Category 5 Hurricane Maria. Early estimates of damage suggested 90% of the buildings on the island had been destroyed, with infrastructure left in ruins. The UK, France and the Netherlands set up shipping and air lifts to take aid to the island; the scale of destruction having left most people homeless.

Dominica won its first two Commonwealth Games medals in silver and bronze in the 2018 Commonwealth Games on the Gold Coast.

President Charles Angelo Savarin was re-elected in 2018 for a new five-year term.

In December 2019, incumbent Prime Minister Roosevelt Skerrit won his fourth consecutive general election eighteen seats to three, becoming the first Dominica Prime Minister ever to do so.

Geography and climate 

Dominica is an island nation in the Caribbean Sea, the northernmost of the Windward Islands (though it is sometimes considered the southernmost of the Leeward Islands).

Known as "The Nature Island of the Caribbean" due to its lush scenery and varied flora and fauna, Dominica is largely covered by rainforest and is home to the world's second-largest hot spring, Boiling Lake. Within its borders lie two ecoregions: Windward Islands moist forests and Windward Islands xeric scrub. The most mountainous of the Lesser Antilles, its volcanic peaks are cones of lava craters, the largest of these being (north-to-south) Morne aux Diables, Morne Diablotins (the highest on the island at 1,447 m), Morne Trois Pitons and Morne Anglais. Morne Trois Pitons National Park is a tropical forest blended with volcanic features; it was recognised as a World Heritage Site on 4 April 1995, a distinction it shares with four other Caribbean islands. The Calibishie area in the country's northeast has sandy beaches. Some plants and animals thought to be extinct on surrounding islands can still be found in Dominica's forests. The island has several protected areas, including Cabrits National Park, as well as 365 rivers. For a few years the government sought to encourage the island as an ecotourism destination, although the hurricane of 2017 has since changed these plans. The country had a 2018 Forest Landscape Integrity Index mean score of 1.06/10, ranking it 166th globally out of 172 countries.

There are two primary population centres: the capital Roseau (with 14,725 inhabitants in 2011) and Portsmouth (with 4,167 inhabitants in 2011). The main centres tend to be located around the coast, with the mountainous interior sparsely populated.

Dominica is especially vulnerable to hurricanes as the island is located in what is referred to as the hurricane region. In 1979, Hurricane David struck the island as a Category 4 hurricane, causing widespread and extreme damage. On 17 August 2007, Hurricane Dean, a Category 1 hurricane at the time, hit the island.  A mother and her seven-year-old son died when a landslide caused by the heavy rains crushed their house. In another incident two people were injured when a tree fell on their house. Prime Minister Roosevelt Skerrit estimated that 100 to 125 homes were damaged, and that the agricultural sector was extensively damaged, in particular the banana crop. In August 2015, Tropical Storm Erika caused extensive flooding and landslides across the island. Multiple communities were evacuated and upwards of 30 people were killed. According to a Rapid Damage and Impact Assessment prepared for Dominica by the World Bank, the total damage and losses from the storm were US$484.82 million or 90% of Dominica's yearly GDP. Category 5 Hurricane Maria struck the island in 2017 and caused losses of approximately US$930 million or 226% of GDP.

Fauna

The Sisserou parrot (Amazona imperialis) is Dominica's national bird and is endemic to its mountain forests. A related species, the Jaco or red-necked parrot (A. arausiaca), is also a Dominican endemic. Both birds are rare and protected, though some forest is still threatened by logging in addition to the long-standing threat of hurricanes.

Dominica has recorded at least four species of snakes and 11 species of lizards. Dominica is the last major stronghold of the critically endangered Lesser Antillean iguana (Iguana delicatissima).

Dominica is home to 195 species of birds. Because of the isolated location of Dominica, this number is lower than that of Trinidad, which is located closer to mainland South-America and has 472 bird species.

The Caribbean Sea offshore of the island of Dominica is home to many cetaceans. Most notably a group of sperm whales live in this area year-round. Other cetaceans commonly seen in the area include spinner dolphins, pantropical spotted dolphins and bottlenose dolphins. Less commonly seen animals include killer whales, false killer whales, pygmy sperm whales, dwarf sperm whales, Risso's dolphins, common dolphins, Atlantic spotted dolphins, humpback whales and Bryde's whales. This makes Dominica a destination for tourists interested in whale-watching.

Territorial disputes

Government

Dominica is a parliamentary democracy within the Commonwealth of Nations. The capital is Roseau. The Commonwealth of Dominica is one of the Caribbean's few republics. The president is the head of state, while executive power rests with the cabinet, headed by the prime minister. The unicameral parliament consists of the 30-member House of Assembly, which consists of 21 directly elected members and nine senators, who may either be appointed by the president or elected by the other members of the House of Assembly.

Unlike other former British colonies in the region, Dominica was never a Commonwealth realm, instead becoming a republic on independence. Dominica is a full and participating member of the Caribbean Community (CARICOM) and the Organisation of Eastern Caribbean States (OECS).

Dominica is also a member of the International Criminal Court, with a Bilateral Immunity Agreement of protection with the US military, as covered under Article 98. In January 2008, Dominica joined the Bolivarian Alternative for the Americas.

Human rights 
Both male and female same-sex sexual activity is illegal in Dominica.

Administrative divisions

Dominica is divided into 10 parishes, given below with their 2011 Census populations:
 Saint Andrew Parish (9,471)
 Saint David Parish (6,043)
 Saint George Parish (21,241)
 Saint John Parish (6,561)
 Saint Joseph Parish (5,637)
 Saint Luke Parish (1,668)
 Saint Mark Parish (1,834)
 Saint Patrick Parish (7,622)
 Saint Paul Parish (9,786)
 Saint Peter Parish (1,430)

Economy 
Dominica's currency is the East Caribbean Dollar. In 2008, Dominica had one of the lowest per capita gross domestic product (GDP) rates of Eastern Caribbean states. The country nearly had a financial crisis in 2003 and 2004, but Dominica's economy grew by 3.5% in 2005 and 4.0% in 2006, following a decade of poor performance. Growth in 2006 was attributed to gains in tourism, construction, offshore and other services, and some sub-sectors of the banana industry. Around this time the International Monetary Fund (IMF) praised the Government of Dominica for its successful macroeconomic reforms, but also pointed out remaining challenges, including the need for further reductions in public debt, increased financial sector regulation, and market diversification.

Agriculture and especially bananas once dominated Dominica's economy, and nearly one-third of the labour force worked in agriculture in the early 2000s. This sector, however, is highly vulnerable to weather conditions and to external events affecting commodity prices. In 2007, Hurricane Dean caused significant damage to the agricultural sector as well as the country's infrastructure, especially roads. In response to reduced European Union (EU) trade preferences for bananas from the former European colonies after the 2009 WTO decision, the government has diversified the agricultural sector by promoting the production of coffee, patchouli, aloe vera, cut flowers, and exotic fruits such as mango, guava and papaya, while the economy has become increasingly dependent on tourism.

The expected increase of Dominica's Citizenship by Investment (CBI) fees has been suspended with no implementation date in sight, as announced by Prime Minister Roosevelt Skerrit, in the 2016 budget speech.

International trade 
Dominica is a beneficiary of the Caribbean Basin Initiative (CBI) that grants duty-free entry into the United States for many goods. Dominica also belongs to the predominantly English-speaking Caribbean Community (CARICOM), the CARICOM Single Market and Economy (CSME), and the Organisation of Eastern Caribbean States (OECS).

Financial services industry 
The Commonwealth of Dominica is becoming in recent years a major international financial centre. The largest sectors are "offshore banking, payment processing companies, and general corporate activities". Regulation and supervision of the financial services industry is the responsibility of the Financial Service Unit of the Commonwealth of Dominica (FSU) under the supervision of the Ministry of Finance. There are a number of service providers. These include global financial institutions including Scotiabank, Royal Bank of Canada, Cathedral Investment Bank, First Caribbean International Bank, and The Interoceanic Bank of the Caribbean.

Starting in the mid-late 1990s, offshore financial centres, such as the Commonwealth of Dominica, came under increasing pressure from the OECD for their allegedly harmful tax regimes, where the OECD wished to prevent low-tax regimes from having an advantage in the global marketplace. The OECD threatened to place the Commonwealth of Dominica and other financial centres on a "black list" and impose sanctions against them. However, the Commonwealth of Dominica successfully avoided being placed on the OECD black list by committing to regulatory reform to improve transparency and begin information exchange with OECD member countries about their citizens.

Dominica supposedly offers tax-free status to companies relocating from abroad. It is not known how many companies benefit from the tax-free status because of the strict confidentiality the government enforces, although it is known many Internet businesses and hedge funds utilise Dominica for this reason. However, on 12 July 2012 Dominica signed an agreement with Poland to exchange tax information.

Economic immigrants 

The Commonwealth of Dominica offers an official and legally mandated economic citizenship to those seeking a valid second citizenship. The nationality law of Dominica authorises the government to waive the normal requirement of seven years of legal residence to acquire citizenship in exchange for an investment into their country's economy. The required contribution for a main applicant starts at US$100,000 through the Economic Diversification Fund. Alternatively, since 2014, applicants can make a US$200,000 minimum investment in pre-approved real estate from island exclusive resorts or global brands like Marriott, Kempinski or Hilton. According to officials, the citizenship by investment (CBI) programme was an economic and fiscal "lifeline" in the aftermath of Tropical Storm Erika in 2015 and Hurricane Maria in 2017, and its new investment option had become the main source of Foreign Direct Investment into Dominica by early 2016. Dominican citizens can travel without a visa, or obtain a visa upon entry, to nearly 140 countries and territories, including the United Kingdom and the Schengen Zone. Applying for Dominica citizenship requires interacting with official Government Approved Economic Citizenship Agents as the first step in the application process. This programme is currently valued at 16% of the government's total revenue.

The government's management of the economic citizenship programme and an initial perceived lack of transparency in the use of the revenues generated are a frequent topic of heated domestic political controversy. Referring to the opposition, Prime Minister Skerrit in 2016 stated that "If they can discredit the Citizenship by Investment Program and make Dominica an unattractive place to obtain citizenship, then revenues would fall and the government would not be able to rebuild the country. Or, the government would then have to increase taxes on the people; making itself unpopular in their sight." Since then, the Government of Dominica has improved transparency of CBI funds. According to Prime Minister Skerrit's 2018–2019 Budget Address, the island's CBI Programme has helped develop a National Health Insurance pilot that provides Dominican children in critical medical conditions with overseas treatment. Because many residents were displaced by Hurricane Maria's impact on the small Caribbean island, the government pledged to build 5,000 hurricane-proof homes, of which the first batch of 125 houses were scheduled for occupancy in February 2019. The CBI Programme has also significantly helped to develop and create jobs in the island's ecotourism sector. Furthermore, the Skerrit administration set aside EC$5m every month for the construction of a new airport.

The Financial Times Professional Wealth Management publication ranked Dominica as the world's best citizenship by investment programme in its annual CBI Index. According to the report, investors choose Dominica's citizenship because it has the most affordable investment threshold, the application process is straightforward and streamlined, while the security checks each applicant is subjected to remain very strict.

Tourism 

Dominica is mostly volcanic and has few beaches; therefore, tourism has developed more slowly than on neighbouring islands. Nevertheless, Dominica's mountains, rainforests, freshwater lakes, hot springs, waterfalls, and diving spots make it an attractive ecotourism destination. Cruise ship stopovers have increased following the development of modern docking and waterfront facilities in Roseau, the capital. Out of 22 Caribbean islands tracked, Dominica had the fewest visitors in 2008 (55,800 or 0.3% of the total). This was about half as many as visited Haiti. The volcanic nature of the island has attracted scuba divers.

Infrastructure

Air 
There are two airports on the island. The primary airport, Douglas-Charles Airport (DOM), now has direct flights from Miami on American Eagle. It is on the northeast coast and is about a 45-minute drive from Portsmouth (1 hour from Roseau). The second is Canefield Airport (DCF), about 15 minutes from Roseau on the southwest coast. Douglas-Charles Airport is suitable for limited use of commercial jets because of runway length. Douglas-Charles currently has regular service by Air Sunshine, Winair and Seaborne Airlines using twin turboprop aircraft like the ATR and Saab 340, as well as Conviasa and Amerijet, which, using Boeing 727 Freighters, is the only airline with jet service to the republic. A runway extension and service upgrade project began at Douglas-Charles Airport around 2006 and was finished in 2010. In March 2013, airline American Eagle halted flights to the island citing high labour costs.

Roads 
Dominica's road network runs primarily along the coastline and along river valleys. Major roads are two-lane highways which connect the capital, Roseau, with Portsmouth (Edward Oliver Leblanc Highway) and the Douglas Charles Airport (Dr. Nicholas Liverpool Highway). It takes about 45 minutes to drive from Portsmouth to Roseau. Private minibuses form the major public transport system. These major roads were reconstructed from the early 2010s to 2015 with assistance from the People's Republic of China and the European Union.

Due to Tropical Storm Erika of 2015 several road surfaces and bridges were damaged by flooding and landslides, including on the just completed E.O. LeBlanc Highway (Roseau to Portsmouth) and Dr. Nicholas Liverpool Highway (Pont Cassé to Douglas Charles Airport). To alleviate this, the government announced that it intended to install emergency bridges in Roseau Valley near the Trafalgar Falls to Wotten Waven and in Emshall. Hurricane Maria of 2017 also damaged the road network.

Green energy 
Dominica's electricity sector includes power from hydroelectricity, solar energy, and geothermal energy. Following on from the devastation caused by Hurricane Maria in September 2017, the Dominican government claimed it would invest in geothermal energy. In early March 2018 Dominica signed an International Solar Alliance Framework Agreement, in an attempt to exploit solar energy to power the country with a source of renewable energy.

Demographics 

The vast majority of Dominicans are of African descent. There is a growing mixed population along with a small European origin minority (descendants of French and British colonists along with some people of Irish descent from indentured servants) and there are small numbers of Lebanese, Syrians and East Asians. Dominica is also the only Eastern Caribbean island that still has a population of pre-Columbian native Kalinago (previously called Caribs), who were exterminated or driven from neighbouring islands.  there are more than 3,000 Kalinago remaining. They live in eight villages on the east coast of Dominica. This special Kalinago Territory (previously Carib Reserve) was granted by the British Crown in 1903.

The population growth rate of Dominica is very low, due primarily to emigration to other countries. In the early 21st century, emigrant numbers for the most popular countries are as follows: the United States (8,560), the United Kingdom (6,739), Canada (605), and France (394).

Dominica had a relatively large number of centenarians. In March 2007, there were 22 centenarians out of the island's 70,000 inhabitants —three times the average incidence of centenarianism in developed countries. The reasons for this were once the subject of a study that formerly had been undertaken at Ross University School of Medicine.

Dominica was partially integrated into the federal colony of the Leeward Islands in 1832. Later, in 1871, it became a full part of the Federation of the Leeward Islands. From the start it was a peculiar relationship for previously Dominica had played no part in the political or cultural traditions of the other more Anglophone islands of the federation. Now, as a Leeward Island, this much larger territory, with thousands of acres of forested unclaimed land, was open to the people of Montserrat and Antigua. At the beginning of the 20th century, the Rose's Company, which produced Rose's lime juice, saw demand for its product outgrow its ability to supply the product from Montserrat. Their response to the situation was to buy land on Dominica and encourage Montserrat farm labourers to relocate. As a result, there came to be two linguistic communities in Dominica, Wesley and Marigot.

In 1902, on 8 May, the Mount Pelée volcano on Martinique erupted destroying the city of Saint-Pierre. Refugees from Martinique arrived in boats to the southern villages of Dominica and some remained permanently on the island.

Languages 
English is the official language of Dominica and is universally spoken and understood. In addition, Dominican Creole, an Antillean Creole based on French, is widely spoken. This is due to French migration to the island starting in 1690, a majority French Creole-speaking population that resided on the island, and its location between the two French-speaking departments of Martinique and Guadeloupe. Since 1979, Dominica has been a member of La Francophonie. Dominican Creole is particularly used among the older generation, which also speaks a patois language. Because of a decline in the use of Creole by the younger generation, initiatives have been set up in an effort to increase usage and promote this unique part of the nation's history and culture.

Along with Creole, a dialect known as Kokoy (or Cockoy) is spoken. It is a type of pidgin English which is a mix of Leeward Island English Creole and Dominican Creole, and is mainly spoken in the north-eastern villages of Marigot and Wesley, by the descendants of immigrants from Montserrat and Antigua. Over time there has been much intermarrying, but there are still traces of difference in origin. As a result of this mixture of languages and heritage, Dominica is a member of both the French-speaking Francophonie and the English-speaking Commonwealth of Nations.

Island Carib, also known as Igneri (Iñeri, Igñeri, Inyeri), was an Arawakan language historically spoken by the Island Caribs of the Lesser Antilles in the Caribbean. The Island Caribs lived throughout the southern Lesser Antilles such as Dominica, St Vincent and Trinidad, supposedly having conquered them from their previous inhabitants, the Igneri. Island Carib became extinct about 1920, but an offshoot survives as Garifuna, primarily in Central America.

Religion 

61.4% of the population is Roman Catholic, though in recent years a number of Protestant churches have been established.  About 10–12% of the population belongs to one of the Seventh-Day (Saturday) denominations, which includes Yahweh Congregation, Church of God (Seventh-Day), and the Seventh-day Adventist Church.

According to the Association of Religion Data Archives, in 2010 the World Christian Database reported that the largest non-Christian religious groups included: spiritualism followed by 2.6% of the population; Baháʼí followed by 1.7%; Agnosticism followed by 0.5%; Buddhism, Hinduism, and Islam, each followed by 0.1%; and Chinese folk religion, Neoreligions, and Atheism each followed by non-negligible proportions (i.e., <0.1%) of the population. The second largest town on the island, Portsmouth, is home to Al-Ansaar Masjid, the first mosque to be built in Dominica. The mosque was constructed with the help of Muslim students from the since relocated Ross University School of Medicine.

Education 

School in Dominica is mandatory up to secondary school. After pre-school, students attend primary school for six or seven years, and are admitted into secondary school on the basis of a Common Entrance Exam. After five years the students take the General Certificate of Education (GCE), widely replaced by the current Caribbean Secondary Education Certificate administered by the Caribbean Examination Council (a 15-member confederation of the Caribbean community (CARICOM)). The more advanced version of this examination, CAPE, can be taken upon completion of two years of community college. The island has its own Dominica State College, formerly named Clifton Dupigny Community College. Some Dominicans attend universities in Cuba on scholarships offered by its government; others go to the University of the West Indies or to universities in the United Kingdom, the United States, or other countries.

Archbold Tropical Research and Education Center, a biological field station owned by Clemson University, is located at Springfield Estate between Canefield and Pont Cassé. In 2006 All Saints University School of Medicine opened in temporary facilities in Loubière, it was later located in Roseau, Dominica. A marine biology institute in Mahaut, the Institute for Tropical Marine Ecology, closed in 2009.

Ross University School of Medicine was located at Portsmouth. Ross had been operating in Dominica since the 1980s. There used to be a thousand medical students arriving annually from the United States and Canada who studied at Ross University, but the campus was permanently relocated to Barbados at the beginning of the 2019 Spring semester due to extensive hurricane damage suffered at the Dominican campus.

The Dominica Library and Information Service serves an integral role in the education of the citizens of the country. The Dominica Library and Information Service (DLIS) is the island's main public sector responsible for library services, information service, and management. Today, it provides service for the population of Dominica through three components, public library services, documentation and research services, and archival services. Under the management of the Ministry of Education and Human Resource Development, the responsibilities of the institution were established in 1843 with the opening of reading rooms, or the first public library in Dominica, Victoria Memorial. Dominica Library and Information Service serves an integral role in the education of the citizens of the country. The creation of a public library in Dominica did not come easily though the impetus was a noble one that would help "the coloured people... [improve] their lot as they moved along the path to complete freedom...” (Boromé, 203). The Dominican library began as a reading room that would evolve into a free and public library that wasn't fully free: patrons were required to pay a subscription fee. Surviving religious and political discord, the great depression, and two world wars, the library finally came under the care of the government where funds were set aside for its upkeep. Ironically, the early stages of the library's history were dedicated to remove the "uncouth", and "barbarous patois", which today is being preserved. However, it did achieve its goal of "diminishing the island’s very high percentage of illiteracy" (pg. 225). However, the historical library was demolished in the wake of hurricane Maria in 2018, and slated to be rebuilt with a more modern outlook.

Culture 

Dominica is home to a wide range of people. Although it was historically occupied by several native tribes, the Arawaks (Tainos) and Carib (Kalinago) tribes occupied it at the time European settlers reached the island. "Massacre" is a name of a river dedicated to the mass murder of the native villagers by English settlers on St. Kitts -the survivors were forced into exile on Dominica. Both the French and British tried to claim the island and imported slaves from Africa for labour. The remaining Caribs now live on a  territory on the east coast of the island. They elect their own chief. This mix of cultures has produced the current culture.

Music and dance are important facets of Dominica's culture. The annual independence celebrations display a variety of traditional song and dance. Since 1997, there have also been weeks of Creole festivals, such as "Creole in the Park" and the "World Creole Music Festival".

Dominica gained prominence on the international music stage when in 1973, Gordon Henderson founded the group Exile One and an original musical genre, which he coined "Cadence-lypso". This paved the way for modern Creole music. Other musical genres include "Jing ping" and "Cadence". Jing ping features the accordion and is native to the island. Dominica's music is a mélange of Haitian, Afro-Cuban, African and European traditions. Popular artists over the years include Chubby and the Midnight Groovers, Bells Combo, the Gaylords (Dominican band), WCK, and Triple Kay.

The 11th annual World Creole Music Festival was held in 2007, part of the island's celebration of independence from Great Britain on 3 November. A year-long reunion celebration began in January 2008, marking 30 years of independence.

Dominica is often seen as a society that is migrating from collectivism to that of individualism. The economy is a developing one that previously depended on agriculture. Signs of collectivism are evident in the small towns and villages which are spread across the island.

The novelist Jean Rhys was born and raised in Dominica. The island is obliquely depicted in her best-known book, Wide Sargasso Sea. Rhys's friend, the political activist and writer Phyllis Shand Allfrey, set her 1954 novel, The Orchid House, in Dominica.

Much of the Walt Disney film Pirates of the Caribbean: Dead Man's Chest (the second in the series, released in 2006), was shot on location on Dominica (though in the film it was known as "Pelegosto", a fictional island), along with some shooting for the third film in the series, At World's End (2007).

Cuisine 

Dominica's cuisine is similar to that of other Caribbean islands, particularly Jamaica, Saint Lucia and Trinidad and Tobago. Like other Commonwealth Caribbean islands, Dominicans have developed a distinct twist to their cuisine. Breakfast is an important daily meal, typically including saltfish, dried and salted codfish, and "bakes" (fried dough). Saltfish and bakes are combined for a fast food snack that can be eaten throughout the day; vendors on Dominica's streets sell these snacks to passersby, together with fried chicken, fish and fruit and yogurt "smoothies". Other breakfast meals include cornmeal porridge, which is made with fine cornmeal or polenta, milk or condensed milk, and sugar to sweeten. Traditional British-influenced dishes, such as eggs and toast, are also popular, as are fried fish and plantains.

Common vegetables include plantains, tannias (a root vegetable), sweet potatoes, potatoes, rice and peas. Meat and poultry typically eaten include chicken, beef and fish. These are often prepared in stews with onions, carrots, garlic, ginger and herbs. The vegetables and meat are browned to create a rich dark sauce. Popular meals include rice and peas, brown stew chicken, stew beef, fried and stewed fish, and many different types of hearty fish broths and soups. These are filled with dumplings, carrots and ground provisions.

Sports 
Cricket is a popular sport on the island, and Dominica competes in test cricket as part of the West Indies cricket team. In West Indies domestic first-class cricket, Dominica participates as part of the Windward Islands cricket team, although they are often considered a part of the Leeward Islands geographically. This is due to being part of the British Windward Islands colony from 1940 until independence; its cricket federation remains a part of the Windward Islands Cricket Board of Control.

On 24 October 2007, the 8,000-seat Windsor cricket stadium was completed with a donation of EC$33 million (US$17 million, €12 million) from the government of the People's Republic of China.

Netball, basketball, rugby, tennis and association football are gaining popularity as well.

International footballer Julian Wade, Dominica's all-time top goal scorer (as of 2021), currently plays for Brechin City F.C. in Scotland.

During the 2014 Winter Olympics, a husband and wife team of Gary di Silvestri and Angela Morrone di Silvestri spent US$175,000 to register as Dominican citizens and enter the 15 km men's and 10 km women's cross-country skiing events, respectively. Angela did not start her race, and Gary pulled out several hundred meters into his race. To date, they are Dominica's only Winter Olympic athletes.

Athlete Jérôme Romain won the bronze medal at the 1995 World Championships in Athletics triple jump competition. He also qualified for the finals at the 1996 Olympic Games; even though he had to pull out due to injury, his 12th position is the best performance of a Dominican ever at the Olympics.

Sprinter Olympian Chris Lloyd won the bronze medal at the 2007 Pan American Games over 400m.

Triple Jump Olympian Thea LaFond became the first athlete to ever win a medal at the 2018 Commonwealth Games.

Media 
Dominica has two major newspapers, The Sun and The Chronicle. There are two national television stations and a few radio stations, including Stations include: ZBC-AM 590, the first private local radio station is called Radio En Ba Mango 93.5/96.9FM in the Village of Berricoa Grand Bay and is owned by Urban Dangleben, ZGBC-AM 740, ZGBC-FM 90.7 (Portsmouth), ZGBC-FM 102.1 (Roseau) and ZGBC-FM 106.1 (Marigot), Q95 FM, the Dominica Broadcasting Corporation, and Kairi FM. Before 2004, there were two telecommunication companies Cable and Wireless and Marpin TV founded by Dominican, Ronald Bernard Maroni Abraham. In 2005, Digicel and a UK-based company Orange started to offer service to the island. There are a number of mobile networks operating on the island; LIME and Digicel compete for most of Dominica's wireless customers. Orange shut down in 2010 and is no longer operating on the island of Dominica.

Historical newspapers include The Dominican,  The Dominica Guardian , and the Dominica Colonist, available for free in the Digital Library of the Caribbean.

Notable people
 

David Jno Baptiste aka Ras Jumbo, bass guitar player
Jerelle Joseph, scientist and academic

See also 

 Index of Dominica-related articles
 List of people from Dominica
 Outline of Dominica

References

External links 

Reference
 Country profile, Government portal
 Commonwealth of Dominica. The World Factbook. Central Intelligence Agency.
 Dominica entry at Encyclopædia Britannica
 Dominica at UCB Libraries GovPubs
 Dominican creole or Kwéyòl (presentation, vocabulary and conversation guide)}
 
 Country Profile from BBC News

Government
  Commonwealth of Dominica Government portal
 Discover Dominica: Nature Island of the Caribbean, official government tourism website by the Discover Dominica Authority.
 Statistics Commonwealth of Dominica
 Invest Dominica Authority

Geography
 
 
 WikiSatellite view of Dominica at WikiMapia

 
1690 establishments in North America
1690 establishments in the French colonial empire
1690s establishments in the Caribbean
1800s establishments in the Caribbean
1805 establishments in North America
1805 establishments in the British Empire
1970s establishments in the Caribbean
1978 establishments in North America
City-states
Colonial government in the West Indies
Countries in North America
Countries in the Caribbean
English-speaking countries and territories
Former French colonies
French Caribbean
French-speaking countries and territories
Hotspot volcanoes
Island countries
Islands of Dominica
Member states of the Caribbean Community
Member states of the Commonwealth of Nations
Member states of the Organisation internationale de la Francophonie
Member states of the Organisation of Eastern Caribbean States
Member states of the United Nations
Republics in the Commonwealth of Nations
Small Island Developing States
States and territories established in 1978
Volcanic islands
Windward Islands